Mount Nemo is a  summit in British Columbia, Canada.

Description

Mount Nemo is located in the Battle Range of the Selkirk Mountains. Precipitation runoff from Nemo drains into tributaries of the Duncan River. Mount Nemo is more notable for its steep rise above local terrain than for its absolute elevation.

History

The mountain was named by Sterling B. Hendricks in 1947 for Captain Nemo, the fictional character in Jules Verne's 1870 novel Twenty Thousand Leagues Under the Seas. The landform's toponym was officially adopted on November 1, 1963, by the Geographical Names Board of Canada.

The first ascent of the summit was made on July 18, 1959, by Samuel Silverstein, Douglas Anger and Fenwick Riley.

Climate

Based on the Köppen climate classification, Mount Nemo is located in a subarctic climate zone with cold, snowy winters, and mild summers. Winter temperatures can drop below −20 °C with wind chill factors below −30 °C. This climate supports the Nemo Glacier south of the peak.

See also
Geography of British Columbia

References

External links
 Mount Nemo: Weather forecast

Three-thousanders of British Columbia
Selkirk Mountains
Kootenay Land District